Surangani is a 1955 Sri Lankan drama film directed by Cyril P. Abeyratne.

Plot

Cast 
 Kanthi Gunatunga as Ramya
 Eddie Junior as Sena
 D.R. Nanayakkara as Kuda
 Pearl Vasudevi
 Lilian Edirisinghe
 Disna Ranjani
 G. S. B. Rani as Aunt
 M P Gemunu
 Sujeeva Lalee
 Kingsley Jayasekera

Production 
The film was produced by The Ceylon Theatres Ltd. and was released on 19 February 1955 at Elphinstone (Maradana ) & 13 other centres through Ceylon Theatres circuit.

Soundtrack 
The music was composed by T. R. Paapa. Popular songs included 
Aaley Pem Res Dahara – G. S. B. Rani Perera
Suranganaavi Maage
Sapaa Jeewey Uthum (Rupe Bale) – Dharmadasa Walpola
Koibatado Mey Sathaa – Eddie Junior
Seyaava Anduna Roopey
Kandukaraye Shantha Sandhyawe – Dharmadasa Walpola
Prem Santhapaye – Dharmadasa Walpola and G. S. B. Rani Perera
Deepey Sri Lanka Dilena – G. S. B. Rani Perera

References 

1955 drama films
1955 films
Sri Lankan black-and-white films
Sri Lankan drama films